Ken Hamlin (born January 20, 1981) is a former American football safety in the National Football League (NFL). He was drafted by the Seattle Seahawks in the second round of the 2003 NFL Draft and also played for the Dallas Cowboys, Baltimore Ravens and Indianapolis Colts. He played college football at Arkansas. Hamlin earned a Pro Bowl selection with the Cowboys in 2007. He was also the first freshman and only the second defensive back to lead the school in tackles, recording 104 (57 solo).

On October 17, 2005, he was involved in an altercation that allegedly took place between himself and two unidentified men in a Seattle nightclub. As a result of the incident, Hamlin suffered multiple injuries that ended his 2005 season after just five games. The injuries included a       fractured skull, a small blood clot, and bruising of the brain tissue.

Early years
Hamlin attended Frayser High School in Frayser neighborhood of Memphis where he was the Class 3A Player of the Year as a senior in 1999, when he gained 2,327 all-purpose yards and rushed for 1,276 yards and 16 touchdowns and recorded 380 receiving yards. He also recorded 136 tackles (96 solo) and eight interceptions as a safety. He also lettered in track and baseball. He was also a member of the school's National Honor Society and the senior class vice president.

College career
Hamlin then attended the University of Arkansas where he became the first freshman and only the second defensive back to lead the school in tackles, recording 104 (57 solo). As a freshman, he was named an All-American by The Sporting News and Football News and also named to the SEC Coaches Freshman All-SEC team. As a sophomore, he was named a Second-team All-American by The NFL Draft Report and also named First-team All-SEC.

As a junior, he forced eight fumbles, recovered five, deflected 28 passes and intercepted nine. For his performance, he was named a First-team All-American by The NFL Draft Report and The Sporting News and nominated for the Jim Thorpe Award. He also became the first player in school history to record more than 100 tackles in a season three times. He was also nominated in 2002 for the Bronko Nagurski Trophy, given to the best defensive player in the nation. In his college career, Hamlin played in 36 games finishing with 381 tackles (221 solo), breaking the school record of 367 tackles by Cliff Powell (1967–69). Hamlin is a member of Omega Psi Phi fraternity. During his junior season, he helped Arkansas win a share of the 2002 SEC West Division Championship.

Professional career

Hamlin entered the National Football League after his junior season at Arkansas where he was considered the Razorbacks best defensive back since Steve Atwater (1985–88). Hamlin was selected in the second round (42nd overall) of the 2003 NFL Draft by the Seattle Seahawks.

Seattle Seahawks
As a rookie, Hamlin started 14-of-16 games making Pro Football Weeklys All-Rookie Team. He finished second on team with 96 tackles and was third on the team with 10 passes defended. In his first career start against the New Orleans Saints on September 7, he recorded five tackles and gained national attention after knocking off Donte' Stallworth's helmet on a hit over the middle. 

In 2004, he started all of the team's 16 regular season games and finished third on the team with 79 tackles. He was fourth on the team with a career-high four interceptions, which ranked 10th in the NFC. In 2005, he started the first six games of the season, recording 26 tackles, before suffering off-field head injuries. He was placed on the Reserve/Non-Football Injury list on November 1 and missed the rest of the season. In 2006, Hamlin started all 16 regular-season games and finished second on the team with 96 tackles while recording three interceptions (led the team), 11 pass deflections, and one forced fumble.

2005 altercation
Hamlin was involved in an altercation that allegedly took place between himself and two unidentified men in a Seattle nightclub on October 17, 2005. According to a police report, Hamlin and his girlfriend were leaving the club at about 2 a.m., several hours after the Seahawks defeated the Houston Texans. Hamlin's girlfriend told officers that he placed a hand on another man's shoulder and said, "Excuse me." The man told Hamlin to stop pushing, and the two men began shoving one another. According to the report, Hamlin punched the man in the face. Another man knocked Hamlin down. Other witnesses told police another man hit Hamlin twice with a street sign.

Hamlin sustained serious injuries to his head due to a blow from a street sign. He was rushed to a local hospital in critical condition with a fractured skull, a small blood clot and bruising of the brain tissue. He was released on October 20, 2005 in stable condition. He did not play football for the rest of the season.

Dallas Cowboys
In the free agency period of 2007, teams were reluctant to offer Hamlin a multi-year contract because of concerns stemming from his previous head injury. On March 23, he signed a one-year contract worth $2.5 million with the Dallas Cowboys.

In his first season with the Cowboys, he earned his first Pro Bowl selection, being named a starter for the NFC and was one-of-13 Cowboys selected - setting a team and NFL record. He started all 16 games at free safety recording career-bests with 102 tackles (third on the team) - his first career 100-tackle season - five interceptions (second on the team and tied for ninth in the league) and 14 pass breakups. He made his Cowboys debut against the New York Giants on September 9, recording nine tackles and one pass breakup.

After the season, on February 21, 2008, the Cowboys placed a franchise tag on him, insuring he would play at least one more year with the team. On July 15, he was rewarded with a six-year, $38 million contract. In 2008, Hamlin was elected as one of the defensive team captains for the season and finished fourth on the team - first in the secondary - with 92 tackles, along with three pass breakups, one interception, a sack, a forced fumble and a fumble recovery. The next year, he registered 12 starts (missed 4 games with a high ankle injury), 74 tackles and 4 passes defensed. He was released on April 2, 2010.

Baltimore Ravens
Hamlin was signed by the Baltimore Ravens on June 17, 2010. Third on the depth chart behind Haruki Nakamura and Tom Zbikowski, he was released by the Ravens on 22 Sept 2010. Hamlin dressed for both regular season games before his release, but recorded no statistics.

On September 29, 2010, the Ravens re-signed Hamlin; taking the roster spot of defensive end Trevor Pryce, who was released and subsequently signed with the New York Jets. He intercepted Tom Brady when the Ravens played against the New England Patriots.  The Ravens again released Hamlin on November 30, 2010. He played mainly on special teams and had three defensive tackles during his time with the team.

Indianapolis Colts
On December 22, 2010, Hamlin was signed by the Indianapolis Colts, filling the roster spot made available when Austin Collie was placed on injured reserve. He played in two regular season games but did not record a statistic. In the playoffs against the New York Jets he posted 3 tackles in a reserve role. He wasn't re-signed at the end of the season.

NFL statisticsKey GP: games played
 COMB: combined tackles
 TOTAL: total tackles
 AST: assisted tackles
 SACK: sacks
 FF: forced fumbles
 FR: fumble recoveries
 FR YDS: fumble return yards 
 INT: interceptions
 IR YDS: interception return yards
 AVG IR: average interception return
 LNG: longest interception return
 TD: interceptions returned for touchdown
 PD': passes defensed

References

External links

Indianapolis Colts bio
Official Website

1981 births
Living people
People from Memphis, Tennessee
Players of American football from Tennessee
American football safeties
National Conference Pro Bowl players
Arkansas Razorbacks football players
Seattle Seahawks players
Dallas Cowboys players
Baltimore Ravens players
Indianapolis Colts players
Ed Block Courage Award recipients